Michał Józefczyk (September 29, 1946 – June 20, 2016) was a Polish Catholic priest since 1972, a prelate 
since 1994, a protonotary apostolic since 2002, and a provost of the Church of Our Lady of Perpetual Help in Tarnobrzeg since 1979. He was born in Krościenko Wyżne, and studied theology as a seminary clerical student in Przemyśl. He was consecrated as a priest in Miejsce Piastowe on June 17, 1972.

Awards and orders
Finalist of Provost Of The Year in 2000. 

Honoured as a "Provost of Third Millennium" by the Polish Catholic News Agency (Katolicka Agencja Informacyjna).  Tarnobrzeg City Hall appreciated also his public and social work, by naming him "Citizen of Tarnobrzeg of 20th Century". 

Listeners of the local Radio Leliwa and viewers of cable Miejska Telewizja Tarnobrzeg named him "Citizen of Tarnobrzeg in 2008". For his working for children he was decorated by them by Order of the Smile  on November 4, 2006.

See also
 Roman Catholic Diocese of Sandomierz
 Roman Catholic Archdiocese of Przemyśl

References

1946 births
2016 deaths
Knights of the Order of Polonia Restituta
Recipients of the Gold Cross of Merit (Poland)
People from Tarnobrzeg
Deaths from cancer in Poland
Polish Roman Catholic priests